William Favill Tuke (15 August 1863 – 18 April 1940) was an English banker. He served as chairman of Barclays Bank from 1934 to 1936.

Early life
He was the son of William Murray Tuke (1822–1903), who had a "substantial tea business in York". He was descended from the Quaker tea merchant and philanthropist William Tuke (1732–1822). He was educated at the former Oliver's Mount School, Scarborough.

Career
W. F. Tuke was chairman of Barclays from 1934 to 1936.

Personal life
His son Anthony Tuke (1897–1975) was chairman of Barclays  from 1951 to 1962. His grandson Sir Anthony Favill Tuke (1920-2001) was chairman of Barclays from 1973 to 1981.

References

External links

1863 births
1940 deaths
English bankers
British chairpersons of corporations
Chairmen of Barclays
William Favill